People with the surname Blankenbaker include:
George Blankenbaker (born 1933), American Old Testament theologian
John Blankenbaker (born 1929), American, designer and inventor of the Kenbak-1, considered the first personal computer
Virginia Murphy Blankenbaker (born 1933), American politician and educator

See also
Lynne Blankenbeker, American politician